This is a list of awards and nominations received by South Korean singer, songwriter, and actor Baekhyun.


Awards and nominations

See also 
 List of awards and nominations received by Exo

References 

Baekhyun
Awards